A mud bath is a bath of mud, commonly found in areas where hot spring water can combine with volcanic ash. Mud baths have a long history that dates back thousands of years. Mud baths are conceived as public bathing spaces created in open areas.  However, the commercialisation of the idea led to its presence in many high-end spas in many countries of the world.

Mud baths come from many sources:  
Lakes (e.g. Lake Techirghiol in Romania and Käina Bay in Estonia)
Saltwater sea (e.g. Dead Sea in Jordan and Israel) 
Hot springs (e.g. Calistoga, Napa Valley, California)
Mud volcano (e.g. Tiga Island, Malaysia, El Totumo, Colombia)

Mud baths in the United States are most common at resorts, particularly in California and Miami Beach, Florida. The mud at these baths consists of a combination of local volcanic ash, imported Canadian peat, and naturally heated mineral waters. 

Historically, mud baths have been used to treat neurological, rheumatologic (osteoarthritis) and cardiovascular disorders, gynecological conditions (inflammatory and menstrual cycle disorders) and skin pathology (eczema, acne, psoriasis, dermatitis).

See also 

 Balneotherapy
 Bath salts
 Heubad
 Mud wrap
 Peloid
 Wallowing

References

Medicinal clay
Bathing